Jurij is a given name. Notable people with the name include:

Jurij Alschitz (born 1947), theatre director, theatre and acting theorist who has lived in Berlin since 1992
Jurij Brězan (1916–2006), Sorbian writer
Jurij Cherednikov (born 1964), Ukrainian-American author and software engineer
Jurij Dalmatin (1547–1589), Slovene Lutheran minister, writer and translator
Jurij Fedynskyj (born 1975), Ukrainian-American folk singer, kobzar and bandurist
Jurij Gering, politician in Slovenia during the first half of the 16th century when it was under the Holy Roman Empire
Jurij Japelj, also known in German as Georg Japel (1744–1807), Slovene Jesuit priest, translator and philologist
Jurij Ambrož Kappus, politician of the 18th century in Slovenia, when the country was under the Holy Roman Empire
Jurij Koch (born 1936), Sorbian writer
Jurij Korenjak, Slovenian slalom canoeist who competed in the early 2000s
Jurij Lopatynsky (born 1906), Ukrainian activist, soldier, colonel in the Ukrainian Insurgent Army
Jurij Moškon (born 1973), Slovenian Film editor
Jurij Moskvitin (1938–2005), classical pianist, composer, philosopher, mathematician and boheme
Janez Jurij Pilgram, politician of the 18th century in Slovenia, when the country was under the Holy Roman Empire
Jurij Rodionov (born 1999), Austrian tennis player
Jurij Rovan (born 1975), Slovenian pole vaulter
Jurij Tazel, politician in Slovenia during the early 16th century when it was under the Holy Roman Empire
Jurij Tiffrer, 16th century politician in Slovenia when the country was under the Holy Roman Empire
Jurij Vega (1754–1802), Slovene mathematician, physicist, artillery officer
Jurij Viditsch, politician of the early 17th century in Slovenia when the country was under the Holy Roman Empire
Jurij Wertatsch, politician of the mid 17th century in Slovenia, when the country was under the Holy Roman Empire

See also
Places in Slovenia:
Sveti Jurij, Rogašovci, village in the Municipality of Rogašovci (known as Jurij from 1955 to 1990)
Sveti Jurij, Rogatec, settlement in the Municipality of Rogatec
Sveti Jurij ob Ščavnici, town and a municipality
Sveti Jurij v Slovenskih goricah, municipality

Slovene masculine given names